Šurlenci is a village on the northeastern shore of Lake Prespa in the Resen Municipality of North Macedonia, east of Galičica.

Demographics
Šurlenci has a population of 89 people, as of the 2002 census, and has historically had a smaller population than most villages in the municipality.

References

Villages in Resen Municipality